Skyblivion is an upcoming open world action role-playing video game. It is a fan remake of The Elder Scrolls IV: Oblivion (2006) developed in Bethesda Game Studios' Creation Engine as a total conversion mod for The Elder Scrolls V: Skyrim (2011). It is scheduled to be released in 2025.

Gameplay

Features
In addition to re-creating what was previously in Oblivion and its DLC, the developers are improving and expanding upon elements of the original game. This includes the user interface (which is being done via the SkyUI modification), textures, environments, cities, dungeons, quests, characters, weapons, and clothing. They're also adding new content such as an expansion of the city of Leyawiin based on concept art from the original game, goblin tribes, and more music.

Development
In 2012, Zilav, a modder and member of The Elder Scrolls Renewal Project began a project to port The Elder Scrolls IV: Oblivion's assets into the Creation Engine (which was used to make ''Oblivions sequel, The Elder Scrolls V: Skyrim). To do this, work was done on writing a tool to port the assets from Oblivion into the engine. However, technical limitations arose with the incompatibility of many files, resulting in broken or empty parts of the map, crashes, and bugs. The initial version of the project, 0.1, was released and onto internet forums. The eventual project lead, K. Rebel (also known as Rebelzize) retroactively called this build a "hot mess." In 2014, Zilav was joined by modder Monocleus, and they released a stable yet incomplete version of the project that would serve as the basis for further development.

In May 2014, the team released version 0.2 of the project, which still required more help in areas such as visual asset creation, modeling, navmeshing, and voice acting. At this point, a selection of mods together could be used to play a portion of the project. 

Sometime after, K. Rebel joined the project, took on the project's PR, and pitched the idea of remaking Oblivion rather than converting the game assets. The idea was approved. By November 2016, Rebel sought help from other modders to help with work on the project. He also did so through Nexus Mods, a site that allows users to upload and download mods. Rebel jokingly called it quote, "the perfect pyramid scheme."

On December 9, 2016, he uploaded a trailer titled "Skyblivion – Return To Cyrodiil." The trailer also resulted in more support, willing volunteers, and an increase in recognition. This included more programmers and 3D artists.

Rebel also hosts livestreams on his channel, showing the development process of the game and answering questions from the viewers. More trailers have been released periodically, showing more content that will be in the final game. Developer diary videos have also been made to present the work being done in more detail. In an email to IGN, Rebel explained that their approach to development is similar to that of a AAA game.

According to Digital Trends, by November 2021, the volunteer team had over 40 members, including individuals who work for large game studios as well as hobbyists.

On January 15, 2023, the two-and-a-half-minute "Official Release Year Announcement Trailer" was uploaded to YouTube, where it was given a release date of 2025 at the latest. The trailer received a significant amount of coverage from news outlets such as Eurogamer, NME, Rock Paper Shotgun, PC Gamer, and GamesRadar+.

Reception
The game has received positive responses leading up to the release, with critics calling the progress "impressive," "breathtaking," and "ambitious." By April 2022, Preston Pearl of ScreenRant said that the game "looks much better" compared to original game.

It received spots on PC Gamer's "8 most ambitious Skyrim mods in development in 2022" list. and number 8 on TheGamer'''s "Skyrim: Top 10 Anticipated Mods" list.

It was awarded ModDBs "Best Upcoming Mod" in 2017.

Further reading

See also
 Skyrim modding

References

External links
 Official website

Action role-playing video games
Role-playing video games
The Elder Scrolls mods
Upcoming video games scheduled for 2025
Video game mods
Video game remakes